Mutah may refer to:
 Nikah mut'ah, a temporary marriage in some branches of Shia Islam
 Mu'tah, a town in Jordan and site of:
the 7th-century Battle of Mu'tah
Mutah University

See also 
 Muta (disambiguation)